Nadezhda Simonyan (February 26, 1922 - June 7, 1997) was a Russian composer who wrote over 40 film scores for movies, radio, and television, as well as chamber and orchestral works, and music for circus performances.

Simonyan was born in Rostov-on-the-Don. She studied composition and piano at Leningrad Conservatory, where she received a diploma in 1950 and earned a medal. Her teachers included Oles Chishko and Venedikt Pushkov.

In 1956, Simonyan wrote her first film soundtrack for Old Man Khottabych, a children’s film by Gennadii Kazanskii. Peter Rollberg described Simonyan’s strength as a composer as a “ . . . warm melodiousness that equally energizes cheerful, dramatic, and tragic episodes with a pragmatic, flexible approach to instrumentation.” In 1960, Italian film maker Federico Fellini praised her soundtrack for the movie Lady with the Dog. She often used smaller chamber orchestras, sometimes with folk instruments, for her film scores.

Simonyan’s compositions included:

Chamber 

Sonata (violin and piano)

Circus 

incidental music

Film scores 

Adventures of Prince Florizel
Chief of Chukotka
Day of Happiness
Duel
Fifth Quarter
Flying Carpet
For No Apparent Reason
Green Dale
In the Town of S
Izhora Battalion
Lady with the Dog
Lyalka-Ruslan and His Friend Sanka
NIghts of Farewell (with Yuri Prokoviev)
Old Man Khottabych
Only One
Pani Mariya
Sinful Angel
Smart Things
Snow Queen
Strict Male Life
Twelve Months
Two Lines in Small Font
Vesenniye Perevyortyshi
While the Mountains Still Stand

Orchestra 

Concerto for Piano and Orchestra

Piano 

pieces

Radio scores 

Golden Apples
On the Bank of Sevan
Story of Turkey
Three Bears
Year of My Birth

Vocal 

Lake Sevan Cantata
romances
songs

Hear music by Nadezhda Simonyan

References 

1922 births
1997 deaths
Russian women composers
Russian film score composers
Musicians from Rostov-on-Don